The Moscow City Court is the highest judicial body of the city of Moscow on civil, criminal, administrative and other cases.

District courts of Moscow

External links
 Official website 

Courts in Russia
Government of Moscow
Municipal courts
1932 establishments in Russia
Courts and tribunals established in 1932